Joel Apezteguía Hijuelos (born 17 December 1983) is a Cuban professional footballer who plays as a forward for Sammarinese team Tre Fiori.

Club career
Apezteguía had spells in the Spanish lower leagues and played in Moldova for Nistru Otaci.

Teuta
He scored four goals in an Albanian Superliga game on 2 February 2014 against KS Lushnja which ended in a 6–2 win and lifted Teuta to second place. He added another three goals to his final tally in Albania in Cup games

CD Utiel
With CD Utiel he scored 7 goals. These were scored against Villareal and Osasuna.

Tre Fiori

Apezteguía made his debut in the Europa League against KÍ Klaksvík, making history as the first Cuban to play in the Champions League.

International career
He made his debut for Cuba national football team on 24 March 2021 in a World Cup qualifier against Guatemala.

Honours

Club
Tre Fiori
Coppa Titano: 2018–19
San Marino Federal Trophy 2019-2020
San Marino Championship 2019-2020

References

http://www.cubadebate.cu/especiales/2018/10/04/la-historia-de-joel-apezteguia-fotos-y-video/#.XLsqWOgzaUk

External links
 
 
 

Living people
1983 births
Kategoria Superiore players
Alma Juventus Fano 1906 players
Association football forwards
CD Utiel players
Cuban expatriate footballers
Campionato Sammarinese di Calcio players
Cuban expatriate sportspeople in Albania
Cuban expatriate sportspeople in Italy
Cuban expatriate sportspeople in Moldova
Cuban expatriate sportspeople in Spain
Cuban expatriates in San Marino
Cuban footballers
Cuba international footballers
CE Manresa players
Eccellenza players
Expatriate footballers in Albania
Expatriate footballers in Moldova
Expatriate footballers in San Marino
Expatriate footballers in Spain
FC Industriales players
FC Nistru Otaci players
KF Teuta Durrës players
Moldovan Super Liga players
S.P. Tre Fiori players
Serie D players
Sportspeople from Havana